Ascocalathium is a genus of fungi in the family Pyronemataceae. It is monotypic, containing the single species Ascocalathium stipitatum.

External links
Index Fungorum

Pyronemataceae
Monotypic Ascomycota genera